The men's 500 metres race of the 2013 World Single Distance Speed Skating Championships was held on 24 March at 15:44 and 17:17 local time.

Results

References

Men 00500